Doassansiopsis is a monotypic genus of fungi belonging to the family Doassansiopsidaceae , within the class Ustilaginomycetes and order Urocystidales.

When order Urocystidales was formed in 1997, and consisted (then) of 4 new families, (Doassansiopsidaceae, Glomosporiaceae, Melanotaeniaceae and Urocystidaceae with 1 genus.

Species
As accepted by Species Fungorum;
Doassansiopsis caldesiae 
Doassansiopsis deformans 
Doassansiopsis euryaleae 
Doassansiopsis furva 
Doassansiopsis guangdongensis 
Doassansiopsis horiana 
Doassansiopsis hydrophila 
Doassansiopsis intermedia 
Doassansiopsis limnanthemi 
Doassansiopsis limnocharidis 
Doassansiopsis nymphaeae 
Doassansiopsis nymphoides 
Doassansiopsis occulta 
Doassansiopsis ticonis 
Doassansiopsis tomasii 

Former genera;
 D. martianoffiana  = Doassansiopsis hydrophila
 D. pustulata  = Burrillia pustulata in Doassansiaceae family

References

Ustilaginomycotina
Basidiomycota genera